.wps is a file extension used for:

 WPS Office Writer files
 Microsoft Works, files
 Rockbox, while playing screen files
 World Programming System program files

References

Computer file formats
Computer files
Computer file systems